Saida Dhahri (born 18 February 1979) is a Tunisian former judoka who competed in the 2000 Summer Olympics and in the 2004 Summer Olympics.

References

1979 births
Living people
Tunisian female judoka
Olympic judoka of Tunisia
Judoka at the 2000 Summer Olympics
Judoka at the 2004 Summer Olympics
African Games medalists in judo
Competitors at the 1999 All-Africa Games
Competitors at the 2003 All-Africa Games
African Games gold medalists for Tunisia
21st-century Tunisian women